Allan Lee Anderson (born January 7, 1964) is an American former professional baseball player. He was a pitcher over parts of six seasons (1986–1991) with the Minnesota Twins, where he led the American League in ERA in 1988. For his career, he compiled a 49–54 record in 148 appearances, with a 4.11 ERA and 339 strikeouts. Anderson, though he pitched for the Twins during the team's World Series Championship seasons of 1987 and 1991, did not pitch in either postseason.

Anderson was born and raised in Lancaster, Ohio, and starred as a pitcher for Lancaster High School and for his American Legion Baseball team.

He was drafted by the Twins in the second round of the 1982 MLB amateur draft.
Currently with; Columbus Division of Fire, Rank- Captain, 21 years

Anderson is currently a real estate agent and auctioneer with Better Homes & Gardens Real Estate (Big Hill) in his hometown of Lancaster, where he also runs the AA Sports LLC Indoor Sports Facility. He is married with two children.

See also
List of Major League Baseball annual ERA leaders

References

External links

1964 births
Living people
Major League Baseball pitchers
Baseball players from Ohio
Minnesota Twins players
American League ERA champions
People from Lancaster, Ohio
Charlotte Knights players
Toledo Mud Hens players
Wisconsin Rapids Twins players
Visalia Oaks players
Elizabethton Twins players
Portland Beavers players
Oklahoma City 89ers players
Fort Lauderdale Yankees players
American firefighters